Jonathan Wade is an Australian curler.

Teams and events

References

External links

Living people
Australian male curlers
Year of birth missing (living people)
Place of birth missing (living people)